2018 Thai League 4 Bangkok Metropolitan Region is the 10th season of the League competition since its establishment in 2009. It is in the 4th tier of the Thai football league system.

Changes from last season

Promoted clubs

Promoted from the 2017 Thailand Amateur League Bangkok Metropolitan Region
 Air Force Robinson

Relegated clubs

Relegated to the 2018 Thailand Amateur League Bangkok Metropolitan Region
 Samut Prakan United

Renamed clubs
 Bangkok Glass B authorize from BGC
 Bangkok United B was renamed to Bangkok United U-23
 Grakcu Look Tabfah Pathum Thani was renamed to Grakcu Sai Mai United

Suspended clubs

 Bangkok Glass B is suspended 1 year from 2017 Thai League 4 Bangkok Metropolitan Region get lower 7th.

Expansion clubs
 BCC Club-licensing football club didn't pass to play 2018 Thai League 4 Bangkok Metropolitan Region. This team is banned 2 years and Relegated to 2020 Thailand Amateur League Bangkok Metropolitan Region.

Reserving clubs
 Police Tero U-23 is Police Tero Reserving this team which join Northern Region first time.
 Port U-23 is Port Reserving this team which join Northern Region first time.

Stadium and locations

League table

Results by match played

Results

Season statistics

Top scorers
As of 25 August 2018.

Hat-tricks

Attendance

Attendance by home match played

Source: Thai League 4
Note: Some error of T4 official match report 10 February 2018 (Police Tero U-23 1–2 BGC). Some error of T4 official match report 25 August 2018 (Air Force Robinson 3–2 Rangsit University).

See also
 2018 Thai League
 2018 Thai League 2
 2018 Thai League 3
 2018 Thai League 4
 2018 Thailand Amateur League
 2018 Thai FA Cup
 2018 Thai League Cup
 2018 Thailand Champions Cup

References

External links
Thai League 4
http://www.thailandsusu.com/webboard/index.php?topic=388919.0
https://web.archive.org/web/20180107103557/http://www.smmsport.com/news.php?category=74

4